The men's 200 metre breaststroke was a swimming event held as part of the swimming at the 1920 Summer Olympics programme. It was the third appearance of the event. 

A total of 24 swimmers from 11 nations competed in the event, which was held from Thursday, August 26 to Sunday, August 29, 1920.

Records

These were the standing world and Olympic records (in minutes) prior to the 1920 Summer Olympics.

Results

Quarterfinals

Thursday, August 26, 1920: The fastest two in each heat and the fastest third-placed from across the heats advanced.

Heat 1

Heat 2

Heat 3

Heat 4

Semifinals

Saturday, August 28, 1920: The fastest two in each semi-final and the faster of the two third-placed swimmer advanced to the final. Since both third-place swimmers had the same time, both advanced to the final.

Semifinal 1

Semifinal 2

Final

Sunday, August 29, 1920:

References

Notes
 
 

Swimming at the 1920 Summer Olympics
Men's events at the 1920 Summer Olympics